Dhum Dhadaka  is a 1985 Indian Marathi-language comedy film directed and produced by Mahesh Kothare. The film stars an ensemble cast of Ashok Saraf, Mahesh Kothare, Laxmikant Berde, Nivedita Joshi, Surekha Rane, Prema Kiran and Sharad Talwalkar. The plot revolves around three young men who will try all ways to impress a wealthy industrialist for approving their marriages. 

The film is a remake of the Tamil movie Kaadhalikka Neramillai (1964), which was also remade earlier in Telugu as Preminchi Choodu (1965), in Hindi as Pyar Kiye Jaa (1966) and in Kannada as Preethi Madu Thamashe Nodu (1979).

Plot 
The film begins with Mahesh Jawalkar (Mahesh Kothare), the son of a poor schoolteacher Nana Jawalkar (Jairam Kulkarni), leaving his village to return to the town where he is working in a factory. Upon reaching the town, Mahesh bumps into a young girl Gauri (Nivedita Joshi), who quarrels with him for driving his new secondhand jeep in a zigzag way. However, Mahesh teaches her a lesson by throwing her car keys up on a tree and leaves her in the helpless condition. 

It eventually turns out that Gauri is the younger daughter of Mahesh's employer Dhanaji Wakade (Sharad Talwalkar). Dhanaji is a haughty industrialist who lives a wealthy lifestyle with his film-obsessed son Laxmikant a.k.a. Lakshya (Laxmikant Berde), older daughter Seema (Surekha Rane) and Gauri. Upon learning that Mahesh is Dhanaji's employer, Gauri complains about his misbehaviour with her to Dhanaji. As a result, Mahesh is fired from his job by Dhanaji.

Nevertheless, the high-esteemed Mahesh protests by building a tent in front of Dhanaji's house with the support of fellow factory workers. He even challenges Dhanaji that he will marry his daughter, but Dhanaji laughs it off. While despising each other, slowly love blossoms between Mahesh and Gauri and they decide to get married with Dhanaji's consent. However, Dhanaji disapproves of his daughter marrying a person below his social status and has the police demolish Mahesh's tent. 

On the other hand, Lakshya, an aspiring filmmaker, spots a village belle named Ambakka (Prema Kiran) at the riverside and plans to select her as the female protagonist in his upcoming film. Ambakka is initially furious with Lakshya's offer and tries to have her wrestler father Baldev Rede (Bapusaheb Gavde) give him a thrashing, but Lakshya manages to escape. After coming to know that fame and richness can be achieved via acting, Ambakka ultimately returns to Lakshya and agrees to work in his film.

Meanwhile, Mahesh contacts his close friend Ashok Gupchup (Ashok Saraf), son of the wealthy Abhay Gupchup (Bhalchandra Kulkarni) from Mumbai, and urgently summons him to town. As per his plan of winning Gauri and Dhanaji over, Mahesh instructs Ashok to pose as an old man, and thus begins the comedy of errors. Ashok transforms himself into Mahesh's estranged father "Yadunath Jawalkar", and arrives at Dhanaji's house as a millionaire who is much greater than the latter. 

A flabbergasted Dhanaji instantly accepts defeat before the success of "Yadunath". "Yadunath" and Mahesh then stage their reconciliation before Dhanaji, who also regrets for his behaviour with Mahesh. Meanwhile, it is revealed that Ashok and Seema have coincidentally met before and fallen in love during a trip to New Delhi. A sudden glimpse of Seema provokes the shocked "Yadunath" into angrily storming out of Dhanaji's house, believing that Mahesh too desires to marry her.

However, Mahesh chases Ashok and clears the misconception. This proceeds with Dhanaji requesting "Yadunath" and Mahesh to stay at his house for a few days as a respect for the two. After returning home, the entire Wakade family is introduced to "Yadunath", who is asked by Lakshya to be the financier of his upcoming film. Impressed with Mahesh's vast fortune, Dhanaji expresses his wish of making him his son-in-law to "Yadunath". Mahesh seizes this opportunity and agrees to marry Gauri, much to Dhanaji's delight. 

Meanwhile, Mahesh confesses about the true identity of "Yadunath" to Gauri, while Ashok also reveals himself to Seema. Further, Seema tells Dhanaji her decision of marrying "Yadunath". Despite their age difference, the shocked Dhanaji agrees for the marriage due to his alliance with the elite "Yadunath". Interrupting Ashok and Seema's romance, the suspicious Lakshya discovers the truth upon finding Ashok's artificial moustache. Despite this, Lakshya agrees to help Ashok and Mahesh in their tactics against Dhanaji. 

However, things take a drastic turn when Dhanaji has two visitors at his house; Ashok's father who is his childhood friend, and Mahesh's father who has not received any news about him since the past few months. The bearded Ashok is not recognized by his father, while Mahesh's father accuses "Yadunath" of cheating on Dhanaji. Mahesh unwillingly confesses of "Yadunath" being his true father for not wanting to put his marriage plan in danger. Dhanaji hands over Mahesh's father to the police upon believing him to be an imposter. 

The restless Mahesh decides to tell the truth to the police, but Ashok points out that doing so can expose their lie and put them both behind bars. Seeing no other way out, Ashok, Mahesh, Seema and Gauri escape from Dhanaji's house in Mahesh's jeep for successfully getting married to each other. They are joined by Lakshya and Ambakka on the way as they also wish to marry against the wishes of Ambakka's father. Meanwhile, Mahesh's father is proven innocent and is acquitted by the police. 

When Dhanaji notices the absence of his children, he chases Mahesh's jeep along with Ashok's father, Mahesh's father and Ambakka's father. They are evaded by their children and instead begin to chase another similar-looking jeep involving the gang of a robber named Rabbar Singh (Bipin Varti). Chasing their jeep, the four old men reach Rabbar Singh's hideout where they are attacked by them. However, Ashok, Mahesh and Lakshya arrive on time and overpower Rabbar Singh and fellow robbers.

Communicated by the headman of Mahesh's village, the police arrive at the scene and arrest Rabbar Singh and fellow robbers. Ashok's father learns about his own son posing as "Yadunath" and agrees for his and Seema's marriage, while Mahesh's father also approves of his and Gauri's marriage. Ambakka's father gives consent to her and Lakshya's marriage too. In the end, Dhanaji realises his folly and decides to have his three children married in hustle and bustle.

Cast 
The cast is listed below (according to the opening credits) -

 Ashok Saraf as Ashok Gupchup / Yadunath Jawalkar (fake) 
 Mahesh Kothare as Mahesh Jawalkar
 Laxmikant Berde as Laxmikant Wakade a.k.a. Lakshya
 Nivedita Joshi as Gauri Wakade
 Surekha Rane as Seema Wakade
 Prema Kiran as Ambakka Rede
 Sharad Talwalkar as Dhanaji Ramchandra Wakade
 Bhalchandra Kulkarni as Abhay Gupchup (Ashok's father) 
 Jairam Kulkarni as Nana Jawalkar (Mahesh's father)   
 Bapusaheb Gavade as Baldev Rede (Ambakka's father) 
 Saroj Sukhtankar as Lakshmi Jawalkar (Mahesh's mother)
 Bipin Varti as Rabbar Singh (robber in the climax scene)

Soundtrack

References

External links

Indian comedy films
1985 comedy films
1985 films
Marathi remakes of Tamil films
Films directed by Mahesh Kothare
1980s Marathi-language films